The third season of the CBS crime drama series Hawaii Five-0 premiered on September 24, 2012 and ended on May 20, 2013.

Cast and characters 
Christine Lahti joined the cast in a recurring role as McGarrett's mother, Doris, who had been revealed to actually still be alive at the end of the previous season. "She's a wonderful addition to the 'H50' family and the fans will certainly enjoy what we have in store for her," said showrunner Peter Lenkov. "Let's just say that the apple doesn't fall far from the tree." Her role lead to a return of McGarrett's girlfriend Catherine, who "shamelessly flirted" with a federal agent to get information about her. 

Ed Asner reprised his role as smuggler August March, a villain from the original series who become the first non-main character from it to have a rebooted version on the new series when McGarrett seeks March's help in apprehending some art thieves. In other casting developments, Lenkov revealed on his Twitter feed that Carlos Bernard had joined the show. He declined to identify which role Bernard would play, but did say that the producers hoped he would appear in "many eps". He appeared in two episodes portraying WITSEC Agent Channing. Ving Rhames was cast as a guest star and possibly more. One episode was slated to flash back to Danny's New Jersey police days when he had to deal with Rhames's character, leading to a possible recurring role in the present. However, the episode aired and Rhames did not appear.

Main cast 
 Alex O'Loughlin as Lieutenant Commander Steven "Steve" McGarrett, United States Navy Reserve
 Scott Caan as Detective Sergeant Daniel "Danny" "Danno" Williams, Honolulu Police Department
 Daniel Dae Kim as Detective Lieutenant Chin Ho Kelly, Honolulu Police Department
 Grace Park as Officer Kono Kalakaua, Honolulu Police Department
 Masi Oka as Dr. Max Bergman, Chief Medical Examiner
 Michelle Borth as Lieutenant Catherine Rollins, United States Navy

Recurring 
 Reiko Aylesworth as Dr. Malia Waincroft
 William Baldwin as Frank Delano
 Dennis Chun as HPD Sergeant Duke Lukela
 Mark Dacascos as Wo Fat
 Ian Anthony Dale as Adam Noshimuri
 Daniel Henney as Michael Noshimuri
 Teilor Grubbs as Grace Williams
 Richard T. Jones as Governor Sam Denning
 Christine Lahti as Doris McGarrett
 Will Yun Lee as Sang Min Sooh
 Taryn Manning as Mary Ann McGarret
 Taylor Wily as Kamekona Tupuola
 Brian Yang as Che "Charlie" Fong
 Terry O'Quinn as Commander Joe White, United States Navy
 Justin Bruening as Lieutenant Commander William "Billy" Harrington
 Autumn Reeser as Dr. Gabrielle Asano

Notable guest stars 
 Ed Asner as August March
 Jimmy Buffett as Frank Bama
 Treat Williams as Mick Logan
 C. Thomas Howell as Martin Cordova
 David Keith as Commanding Officer Wade Gutches
 Lochlyn Munro as Jim Rogers
 Sydney Tamiia Poitier as Grace
 Terrence Howard as a gang member
 T.I. as a gang member
 Behati Prinsloo as herself
 Alan Ritchson as Freddie Hart
 Rumer Willis as Sabrina Lane
 Vanessa Marcil as Olivia Victor
 Tom Arnold as Ron Alberts
 Jeff Fahey as Professor
 Jason Scott Lee as Detective Kaleo
 Craig T. Nelson as Tyler Cain
 Daniel Baldwin as Paul Delano
 George Takei as Uncle Choi
 Peter Weller as Curt Stoner
 Summer Glau as Maggie Hoapili
 Aisha Tyler as Savannah Walker
 William Sadler as John McGarrett
 Janel Parrish as Rebecca Fine
 Curtis Bush as Security Guard #3
 Duane Chapman as Dog the Bounty Hunter
 Carlos Bernard as WITSEC Agent Chris Channing

Episodes

Production 
On March 14, 2012, CBS renewed Hawaii-Five-0 for a third season. Filming began on July 9, 2012, with a traditional Hawaiian blessing. The season premiered on September 24, 2012. The season premiere aired one day earlier in Hawaii on Waikīkī Beach. In the UK the third season of Hawaii-Five-0 airs as part of Sky 1 Sundays at 9pm and is followed by crossover show NCIS: Los Angeles. Broadcast began on January 6, 2013 for both. 

Online voting by viewers determined the ending of the January 14, 2013 episode "Kapu" ("Forbidden"), with two zones, Eastern and Central Time Zones, and Mountain and Pacific Time Zones, each getting their own result. Each alternate ending could be seen online after the episode aired.

The episode "Hookman" was inspired by the episode of the same title from the original series. Locations from the original episode were used in the new one. Peter Weller directed the episode and played the amputee, though Jason Kroger, a double amputee, stood in for Weller for closeups of his hands. The episode credits (although not the end titles) were done in the style of the original series, including having the episode title be shown on screen.

Reception

Ratings

Home Video Release

References

External links 
 
 
 List of Hawaii Five-0 episodes at The Futon Critic
 

2012 American television seasons
2013 American television seasons
Hawaii Five-0 (2010 TV series) seasons